The Crown Mines are two tin mining engine houses in the village of Botallack in Cornwall, England, United Kingdom, at the end of a track to the cliffs there. They are set deep down in the cliff face. Their tunnels extended under the sea bed for a few miles.

The mines are now ruins protected by the National Trust.

References

External links
 National Trust page
 ROSELANDS Caravan Park Online contains a small photo of the Crown Mines area.

Geography of Cornwall
National Trust properties in Cornwall
Mining in Cornwall